Majid Karimov (born 16 December 1958) ( is an Azerbaijan statesman and public person.

Minister of Fuel and Energy of the Republic of Azerbaijan (2001–2004), Minister of Industry and Energy of the Republic of Azerbaijan (2004–2005). President of Azerichimia State Company of the Republic of Azerbaijan (2005-2010). Member of  Parliament of the Republic of Azerbaijan of the III convocation. Professor, Doctor of technical sciences. Emeritus Scientist of the Republic of Azerbaijan.

Career 
1980 - graduated cum laude from the Azerbaijan Institute of Oil and Chemistry

1980-1989 - worked in the field of oil and gas engineering

1989-1999 - held different positions in the State Oil Company of the Republic of Azerbaijan (SOCAR)

1999-2001 - Director of "Gipromorneftegas" State Scientific Research and DesignInstitute  of the SOCAR

2001-2004 - Minister for Fuel and Energy of the Republic of Azerbaijan 

2004-2005 - Minister for Industry and Energy of the Republic of Azerbaijan 

2005 - President of Azerichimia State Company of the Republic of Azerbaijan 

2006 - 2010 Member of Parliament of the Republic of Azerbaijan 

2008 - titled Emeritus Scientist by the President of the Republic of Azerbaijan

By the decree of the President of the Azerbaijan Republic of 2001 Mr. Karimov was appointed a chairman of the State Commission for implementation of 4 major international projects: Azeri-Chirag-Guneshly (ACG), Shakh-Deniz, Baku-Tbilisi-Ceyhan (BTC) and Baku-Tbilisi-Erzerum.

Managed projects in the areas of oil and gas field exploitation, oil and gas transportation and processing, petrochemical and chemistry production, etc.
The following programmes approved by the President of Azerbaijan were supervised by Mr. Kerimov: the “State Programme for the development of the fuel and energy complex of the Republic of Azerbaijan for the period of 2005-2015» and the “State Programme for the use of alternative energy sources in the Republic of Azerbaijan”. Presently, these Programmes are being successfully implemented.
As a member of the Azerbaijani Government attended various international conferences held in England, Germany, France, Russia, Turkey, Norway, Saudi Arabia, Egypt, Georgia, etc. 
Chaired the oil and gas conferences traditionally held in Azerbaijan 
Actively participated in developing relations with such international organizations, as the European Energy Charter, Organization for the Black Sea Economic Cooperation, and international financial institutions, such as the World Bank, International Monetary Fund, Asian Development Bank, European Bank for Reconstruction and Development, etc.

Author of more than 200 scientific articles, 10 books and monographs, and tens of innovations.
Married with 2 children.

References 

Azerbaijani engineers
Members of the National Assembly (Azerbaijan)
Government ministers of Azerbaijan
1958 births
Living people